(aka JTB), is the largest travel agency in Japan and one of the largest travel agencies in the world. It specializes in tourism. There are branches all over the world to help Japanese and non-Japanese guests in both private leisure and corporate / business fields. It was formerly owned by the Japanese government. It is headquartered in the JTB Building in Shinagawa, Tokyo.

History
The company was established as "" in 1912, primarily serving foreign visitors to Japan. After World War II, the company was renamed as "". In 1963, Japan Travel Bureau was divided into two separate entities, with the travel agency arm becoming an independent corporation while the foundation remained a non-profit organization. However, both organizations retained the Japan Travel Bureau banner. On January 1, 2001, the corporation was renamed "JTB Corporation", while the foundation retained the Japan Travel Bureau name. And then in 1997, operations began.

The original JTB company, "JTB Corporation", has since diversified into other businesses including pharmaceuticals, financial services, consumer goods, publishing, telecommunications and more.  The entity that operates its flagship travel business is JTBGMT which supplies tours and other Japan Travel products directly to customers and to travel agents under its "Sunrise Tour" brand. The publishing arm of JTB Corp. produces the popular "Rurubu" magazine which, in 2010, was recognised by the Guinness Book of World Records as most widely-sold travel guide series in the world. The company also publishes the Japan In Your Pocket series of tourist guide mini-books.

References

External links

 JTB Global Website
 JTB GMT - JTB Branch
 JAPANiCAN.com - Travel website powered by JTB GMT
 JTB - official website 

Travel and holiday companies of Japan
Service companies based in Tokyo
Travel agencies